Mêda is a municipality in Portugal. The population in 2011 was 5,202, in an area of 286.05 km2. The city of Mêda proper had a population of 2,004 in 2001.
It was promoted to city in December 2004.

Municipality
The municipality is located in Guarda District, Centro Region, Beira Interior Norte Subregion. The present Mayor is Anselmo Sousa. The municipal holiday is November 11.

Main monument: 
Marialva Castle/Castelo de Marialva.

Also nearby in the municipalities of Foz Côa and Pinhel is the: Prehistoric Rock-Art Site of the Côa Valley, a World Heritage site.

Parishes
Administratively, the municipality is divided into 11 civil parishes (freguesias):
 Aveloso
 Barreira
 Coriscada
 Dipsy
 Marialva
 Mêda, Outeiro de Gatos e Fonte Longa
 Poço do Canto
 Prova e Casteição
 Rabaçal
 Ranhados
 Vale Flor, Carvalhal e Pai Penela

See also
 Cancelos de Baixo

References

External links
Municipality official website
Photos from Meda

Municipalities of Guarda District
Cities in Portugal